Pénaud or Penaud is a French surname, and may refer to:

People

 Alain Penaud (born 1969), French rugby union player
 Alphonse Pénaud (1850–1880), French pioneer of aviation design and engineering
 Charles Pénaud (1800–1864), French naval officer who rose to the rank of vice-amiral
 Damian Penaud (born 1996), French rugby union player.

Other

 Mount Pénaud, mountain in the Chavdar Peninsula, Graham Land, Antarctica